The 1964–65 FIBA Women's European Champions Cup was the seventh edition of FIBA's competition for European women's basketball national champions. It ran from December 10, 1964, to June 18, 1965, and it was contested by 14 teams. Defending champion Daugava Riga defeated 2-times champions Slavia Sofia, which made its final appearance in the competition, to win its fifth title.

Results

References

Champions Cup
European
European
EuroLeague Women seasons